Trofie (less frequently, troffie, strofie or stroffie) is a short, thin, twisted pasta from Liguria, Northern Italy.

History 
Modern trofie seems to originate from Golfo Paradiso, a strip of land in the Riviera di Levante including maritime towns like Recco, Sori, Camogli and other comuni in the area. This pasta shape was not so common in Genoa until the mid-20th century, though the term trofie was already in use there and referred to gnocchi as a whole. Genovese trofie was traditionally made with either wheat or chestnut flour and, from the beginning of the 19th century, with the addition of potatoes also.

Today trofie is a staple of modern Ligurian cuisine. It is also made in a small version called trofiette in Italy.

Etymology 

The origin of this pasta name is not certain. It is believed to come from the Ligurian verb strufuggiâ ("to rub") as a reference to its method of preparation, which consists in "rubbing" or rolling a small piece of dough on the pastry board.

Description 
Trofie is shaped by rolling a small piece of dough on a flat surface to form a short, round length of pasta with tapered ends, then twisting it to form the final shape. The average cooking time is 10 to 15 minutes.

In Italian cuisine, it is most typically served with a pesto sauce.

See also
 Cuisine of Liguria
 List of Italian dishes

Notes

References 

Types of pasta
Cuisine of Liguria